Martin Grams Jr. (born April 19, 1977) is an American popular culture historian who wrote and co-wrote over thirty books about network broadcasting and motion-pictures. Born in Baltimore, Maryland, Grams is the son of a magician, Martin Grams Sr. and Mary Patricia Grams, a librarian. Grams is also the author of more than 100 magazine articles.

Grams is the recipient of the 1999 Ray Stanich Award, the 2005 Stone/Waterman Award, and the 2004 Parley Baer Award for his contribution to preserving the arts. In February 2022, he received the Stan Cawelti award from the Metro Washington OTR Club.

In an interview for USA Today in April 2011, Grams stood his ground on a controversial subject regarding research in a digital age. In November 2010, Grams publicly stated: "I know of no serious researcher or scholar who uses the internet as reference for their studies. They should use the internet as a 'tool' for research... Myths begin when mistakes in prior publications carry over into new publications. Reprinted many times, a myth becomes the gospel... proving that fifteen books can be wrong and 100 websites are definitely wrong."

Many of his books include forewords by celebrities including Patricia Hitchcock, daughter of Alfred Hitchcock, contributing to his The Alfred Hitchcock Presents Companion; Joe Dante for Way Out: A History and Episode Guide to Roald Dahl's Spooky 1961 Television Program; George Clayton Johnson for his award-winning The Twilight Zone: Unlocking the Door to a Television Classic; and Bob Barker for Truth or Consequences, The Quiz Show That was a National Phenomenon.

Martin Grams provided audio commentary for The Twilight Zone Blu-ray release. He wrote and narrated a video documentary for the Inner Sanctum Mystery Blu-ray Release. He also wrote the liner notes for over fifty DVD and Blu-ray releases including the VCI entertainment release of The Green Hornet (1940) and The Green Hornet Strikes Again (1941), reviewed as "wonderfully detailed liner notes by writers Martin Grams Jr., and Terry Salomonson".

Martin served as the editor of Radio Recall, a bi-monthly newsletter for the Metro Washington OTR Club, from 2017 to April 2021.

Martin was nominated twice for the Rondo award, winning the 2008 award for ‘Best Book of the Year’ for The Twilight Zone: Unlocking the Door to a Television Classic.

Martin and his wife are volunteers for the annual non-profit film festival known as the Mid-Atlantic Nostalgia Convention. Martin also volunteers for the WIlliamsburg Film Festival, which began in 1997.

Works 
 Suspense: Twenty Years of Thrills and Chills  Morris Publishing, 1998 
 The History of the Cavalcade of America  Morris Publishing, 1999.  
 The CBS Radio Mystery Theater: An Episode Guide and Handbook to Nine Years of Broadcasting, 1974–1982  McFarland Publishing, 1999. 
 The Alfred Hitchcock Story Britain Unk, 1999. 
 Radio Drama: American Programs, 1932–1962  McFarland Publishing, 2000. 
 The Have Gun – Will Travel Companion  OTR Publishing, 2000. 
 The Alfred Hitchcock Presents Companion  OTR Publishing, 2001.  
 Invitation to Learning  OTR Publishing, 2002.  
 It's That Time Again  BearManor Media, 2002.  
 The Sound of Detection: Ellery Queen's Adventures in Radio  OTR Publishing, 2002.  
 It's That Time Again 2  BearManor Media, 2003.  
 The I Love A Mystery Companion  OTR Publishing, 2003.  
 Inner Sanctum Mysteries: Behind the Creaking Door  OTR Publishing, 2002.  
 Information Please  BearManor Media, 2003.  
 Gang Busters: The Crime Fighters of American Broadcasting  OTR Publishing, 2005.  
 The Railroad Hour: A History of the Radio Series  BearManor Media, 2007.  
 I Led Three Lives: The Television Series  BearManor Media, 2007.  
 The Radio Adventures of Sam Spade  OTR Publishing, 2007.  
 The Alfred Hitchcock Story Titan Books, 2008.  
 The Twilight Zone: Unlocking the Door to a Television Classic  OTR Publishing, 2008. 
 The Green Hornet: A History of Radio, Motion Pictures, Comic Books and Television  OTR Publishing, 2010. 
 Car 54, Where Are You?  Bear Manor Media, 2010. 
 The Shadow: The History and Mystery of the Radio Program, 1930–1954  OTR Publishing, 2011. 
 Science Fiction Theatre: A History of the Television Program, 1955–1957  Bear Manor Media, 2011. 
 The Best of Blood n' Thunder: Selections From the Award-Winning Journal  Murania Press, 2011. 
 The Green Lama: The Complete Pulp Adventures  Altus Press, 2012. 
 The Time Tunnel: A History of the Television Program  Bear Manor Media, 2012. 
 Duffy's Tavern: A History of Ed Garner's Radio Program  Bear Manor Media, 2014. 
 The Big Show: The Obscure Career of Tallulah Bankhead  LR Publishing, 2016. 
 The Top 100 Classic Radio Shows Portable Press, 2017. With Carl Amari. 
 WYXIE Wonderland: An Unauthorized 50-Year History of WXYZ Detroit Bold Venture Press, 2017. 
 Bass Reeves and The Lone Ranger: Debunking the Myth LR Publishing, 2017. 
 Way Out: A History and Episode Guide to Roald Dahl's Spooky 1961 Television Program Bear Manor Media, 2019. 
 Truth or Consequences: The Quiz Show That was a National Phenomenon  LR Publishing, 2020. 
 Renfrew of the Mounted: A History of Laurie York Erskine's Canadian Mountie Franchise OTR Publishing, 2020. 
 The Lone Ranger: The Early Years, 1933-1937 OTR Publishing, 2021.

References

External links
Martin Grams official site
Fun Ideas Podcast, 2018
Old-Time Radio Podcast, 2005
A Twilight Zone Podcast Interview with Martin Grams Jr.

1977 births
Living people
21st-century American historians
American male non-fiction writers
American male journalists
American short story writers
Journalists from Pennsylvania
American male short story writers
People from York County, Pennsylvania
Writers from Baltimore
Historians from Pennsylvania
Historians from Maryland
21st-century American male writers